The 1989 Toray Pan Pacific Open was a women's tennis tournament played on indoor carpet courts at the Tokyo Metropolitan Gymnasium in Tokyo in Japan and was part of the Category 4 tier of the 1989 WTA Tour. The tournament ran from January 31 through February 5, 1989. First-seeded Martina Navratilova won the singles title.

Finals

Singles

 Martina Navratilova defeated  Lori McNeil 6–7(3–7), 6–3, 7–6(7–5)
 It was Navratilova's 4th title of the year and the 285th of her career.

Doubles

 Katrina Adams /  Zina Garrison defeated  Mary Joe Fernández /  Claudia Kohde-Kilsch 6–3, 3–6, 7–6(7–5)
 It was Adams' 1st title of the year and the 5th of her career. It was Garrison's 1st title of the year and the 18th of her career.

External links
 Official website 
 Official website 
 Tournament draws